Dimitrios Pliagas (born 26 March 1985) is a Greek wing midfielder who plays for AEL 1964 in Gamma Ethniki.

Career 
Pliagas started his professional career from Panathinaikos FC, but was given on loan and played in several Greek teams mostly in the Second Division, such as Thrasivoulos, Levadiakos, OFI Crete, and Olympiakos Volou.

He made his European Competitions debut playing for OFI Crete against FC Tobol from Kazakhstan during 2007–2008 UEFA Intertoto Cup qualifiers.

External links
 
 
 European Debut

1985 births
Living people
Greek footballers
Athlitiki Enosi Larissa F.C. players
Kavala F.C. players
OFI Crete F.C. players
Association football midfielders
Footballers from Karditsa